Castlelost is a civil parish in County Westmeath, Ireland.

Castlelost is one of 10 civil parishes in the barony of Fartullagh in the Province of Leinster.

Castlelost civil parish comprises the village of Rochfortbridge and 16 townlands: Castlelost, Castlelost West, Clontytallon, Derry, Farthingstown, Gallstown, Garrane, Gneevebane, Gortumly, Kilbrennan, Kiltotan and Collinstown, Oldtown, Piercetown, and Rahanine.

The neighbouring civil parishes are: Carrick, Kilbride and Pass of Kilbride to the north, 
Castlejordan  (County Meath) to the east, Castlejordan (County Offaly), Croghan  (County Offaly) and Newtown to the south and Clonfad to the West.

References

Civil parishes of County Westmeath